Baronne Almaury de Maistre née Henriette-Marie de Sainte-Marie (31 July 1809, Nevers – 7 June 1875, Chaulgnes) was a French composer. In 1831 she married Baron Charles-Augustin Almaury de Maistre. She was the cousin of Joseph de Maistre by marriage and maintained a popular salon. She composed etudes and an opera Roussalka which was presented in Brussels at the Théâtre de la Monnaie in 1870.

References

1809 births
1875 deaths
19th-century classical composers
19th-century French composers
French baronesses
French classical composers
French women classical composers
19th-century women composers